Michael B. Wunderman is a Los Angeles-based entrepreneur, filmmaker, and the former intern of Corum.

Biography
Born and raised in Los Angeles, California. Michael is the son of the late Severin Wunderman; The senior Wunderman came to the United States as a child when his family fled Belgium during World War II. A businessman, art collector, and philanthropist, Severin acquired the license to distribute and manufacture Gucci watches in 1972. and is credited with having expanded the business over the ensuing two and a half decades.

During the mid-1990s, Michael Wunderman launched his career in the luxury watch industry. He began working for Gucci Timepieces in the sales and marketing division then became General Manager of Gucci Timepieces in the United Kingdom.

Following the sale of the Gucci license in 1997, Wunderman briefly left the watch industry to pursue business endeavors elsewhere. He was involved in the purchase and marketing of the Coffee Bean and Tea Leaf chain of specialty coffee stores and established a multimedia marketing company called Wunder Entertainment.

Wunderman returned to the business of high watchmaking following Severin’s acquisition of Corum, a high-end watch manufacturer based in La Chaux-de-Fonds, Switzerland, in 2000. He served as the company’s president from 2004 until its sale in 2013.

Since departing from Corum, Wunderman has pursued filmmaking and real estate. His real estate company is developing a home in the Trousdale Estates neighborhood of Beverly Hills. (scheduled for completion in June 2015).

Wunderman is a board member of the Next Generation Council of the Shoah Foundation, an organization founded by Steven Spielberg, which concerns the remembrance of the Holocaust of World War 2.

Corum
Within a few months of the Wundermans’ purchase of Corum, Severin and Michael introduced twelve new models for the 2000 Basel Watch Fair. The Bubble watch, with its domed sapphire crystal face, was particularly successful; it has since been lauded as an icon of the Corum brand.

Michael Wunderman was actively involved in design and marketing at Corum as of 2000. He worked closely with former head of production for Panerai, Antonio Calce, and with designer, Xavier Perrenoud. In 2004, he became president of the company. During his tenure, he focused on the four “pillars” of the Corum brand: the Admiral’s Cup, Romvlvs, Artisans, and Golden Bridge collections. Corum watches reached record sales with Wunderman at the helm.

In 2013, Wunderman sold the company to China Haidian Group.

Filmmaking
Wunderman’s first film credit was as Executive Producer of Atlas Independent’s comedy-drama, Revenge for Jolly!, starring Oscar Isaac, Elijah Wood, Ryan Phillippe, and Kristen Wiig. The film premiered at the 2012 Tribeca Film Festival and was distributed in North America by Sony Pictures.

Wunderman went on to produce a second picture with Atlas Independent: Open Grave. This zombie suspense film was directed by Gonzalo López-Gallego and was released in the United States in 2014.

References

External links
 
 China Haidian Group

Businesspeople from Los Angeles
American filmmakers
Year of birth missing (living people)
Living people